Ectoedemia angulifasciella is a moth of the family Nepticulidae. It is found in most of Europe, except the Mediterranean Islands.

The wingspan is 5–6 mm. Adults are on wing in July. The head is pale ochreous and the antennal eyecaps ochreous-white. The forewings are black with a somewhat bent sometimes interrupted shining silvery fascia in middle. The outer half of cilia beyond a black line are white. Hind wings are grey.

The larvae feed on Filipendula vulgaris, Rosa canina, Rosa pendulina, Rosa sempervirens, Sanguisorba minor and Sanguisorba officinalis. They mine the leaves of their host plant. The mine consists of a strongly contorted, intestine-like corridor with brown and coiled frass. The last part of the corridor often follows the leaf margin for some distance. At the end, the corridor widens into an elongate blotch. Pupation takes place outside of the mine.

References

External links
bladmineerders.nl
Ectoedemia angulifasciella at UKMoths
Swedish moths
Nepticulidae from the Volga and Ural region
Ectoedemia angulifasciella images at  Consortium for the Barcode of Life

Nepticulidae
Moths of Europe
Moths described in 1849